The name Lehmann may refer to:

Lehmann, surname of several people
Lehmann (lunar crater), a crater on the Moon
Lehmann (crater on Venus), a crater on Venus

See also
Lehman (disambiguation)